San Bernardino City Unified School District is a public school district in San Bernardino County, California that serves most of the city of San Bernardino and the western portion of Highland. The district has an enrollment of approximately 57,000, making it the sixth largest school district in California.

History
The district was founded July 1, 1964 when the San Bernardino City School District merged with the San Bernardino High School District.

District headquarters
The San Bernardino City Unified School District's headquarters is at 777 North F Street, San Bernardino, California.

High schools

Middle schools

Elementary schools

Norton Elementary opened in 2012. Burbank Elementary School opened in 1935 and closed permanently in May 2012. In its final month it had 393 students. The majority of its students were scheduled to move to Norton Elementary.

Charters schools

Other schools

References

External links

School districts in San Bernardino County, California
Education in San Bernardino, California
School districts established in 1964
1964 establishments in California